Caridad Bravo Adams (born on January 14, 1908, in Villahermosa, Tabasco – August 13, 1990 in Mexico City) was a prolific Mexican writer and the most famous telenovela writer worldwide.

She was born to a couple of Cuban actors and she was part of an extended family of artists, being the sister of Venezuelan actor Leon Bravo, one of the pioneers of theater, radio and TV in Venezuela. She published her first book at the age of 16, titled Pétalos sueltos.  She then moved back to Cuba with her parents, and later returned to Mexico, where she kept writing and obtained a role in her only film, Corazón bandolero (1934). She became a chair member of the Ateneo Mexicano de Mujeres and later moved back to Cuba, where she wrote the radionovela Yo no creo en los hombres, which was adapted in Mexico for telenovelas in 1969 and 1988. Upon the rise of Fidel Castro, she returned to Mexico, where she would remain the rest of her life. Back in Mexico, she wrote Corazón salvaje, a novel that has been adapted to the screen twice and as a telenovela four times (including once as Juan del Diablo in Puerto Rico). She then wrote La intrusa, Bodas de odio and other novels that earned her important awards.

The nature of her work 

Caridad Bravo Adams can easily be identified as the Margaret Mitchell of telenovelas. Though she has her own style of writing Caridad's most successful stories are the ones in which she deals with the Margaret Mitchell-like topic of loveless marriage and the process of conquering one's wife. In Corazón salvaje, La mentira, Bodas de odio (and later Amor real), El otro (and later Por tu amor) she deals with the subject of a seemingly loveless marriage that turns out not to be so. Just like Mitchell, Caridad explores the human psychology from the perspective of a protagonist who ignores her true emotions and goes through a process of realizing the feelings that were there all along. Hence a love and hate relationship begins until finally the emotional worlds of the couple come to light. Her male figure is always a dashing Rhett Buttler, noble, strong but hiding his feelings behind irony. Her female figure on the other hand varies keeping as only thing in common with Mitchell's Scarlet O'Hara, her strength of character and stubbornness.

Films as an actress
 Corazón bandolero (1934)

As a writer

Poetry
 Pétalos sueltos (1924)
 Reverbación (1931)
 Trópico(1933)
 Marejada (1940)

Novels
 La mentira o El amor nunca muere (1952)
 Corazón salvaje (1956)
 Tzintzuntzn (La Noche de los Muertos)-1967
 Bodas de odio
 La imperdonable
 La intrusa
 Yo no creo en los hombres
 Cuatrilogía primordial

Plays
 Agustín Ramírez (1962)

Films
 La mentira (1952)
 Pecado mortal (1955)
 Corazón salvaje (1956)
 Orgullo de mujer (1956, novel El otro)
 Cuentan de una mujer (1959)
 Corazón salvaje (1968)
 Deborah (1968)
 La mentira (1970)
 Estafa de amor (1970)

Telenovelas
 La mentira
 Yo no creo en los hombres
 La intrusa/ Gabriela
 Pecado mortal
 El engaño/ Estafa de amor
 Corazón salvaje
 Orgullo de mujer
 El enemigo
 Adiós, amor mío
 Más allá del corazón
 Cita con la muerte
 Cristina Guzmán
 Sueña conmigo Donaji
 Más fuerte que el odio/ Amor en el desierto
 Lo prohibido
 Deborah
 La desconocida
 Águeda
 Cristina
 El precio de un hombre 
 La hiena
 Mamá
 
 Alma y carne
 Bodas de odio
 Herencia maldita
 Una sombra entre los dos / Al pie del altar
 Tormenta de pasiones
 Un Paraíso Maldito / Azul infierno

Awards
 Nezahualcóyolt medal of the Mexican Writers Guild

References

External links
  Biography
 

1908 births
1990 deaths
Mexican people of Cuban descent
Telenovela writers
People from Villahermosa
Mexican LGBT writers
Mexican women journalists
Amor real
20th-century women writers
Women soap opera writers
20th-century Mexican screenwriters
20th-century Mexican LGBT people